HaShir Shelanu (lit. Our Song) was an Israeli daily comical musical telenovela starring Ninet Tayeb that took place for four seasons on the yes-5 Israeli Movie Channel (Arutz Ha'kolnoa Hayisraeli) and repeating on Channel 2. The last episode was broadcast in April 2007.The series was a dizzying success.

General plot

Season 1
118 episodes
Ninet (Ninet Tayeb) is a young, unknown girl from the country who comes to Tel-Aviv and works with her cousin Ronnie (Niv Raz) at his cafeteria in Yardena Tamir's (Alisa Rosen) Academy of Music. After school hours are over Ninet goes to the classroom and sings. Her talent is revealed accidentally by the music teacher, Doron Sadeh (Sa'ar Badishi) who has her enrolled in the school. Ninet falls in love with Zohar Lahat (Ran Danker) and the couple go on a rocky road towards happiness disturbed mainly by Noa Shahar (Efrat Baumwald) who wants Zohar for herself. Her best friend Dana Snir (Aliyana Bakyer) and her mother Naomi (Hana Laslow) help her by driving Zohar and Ninet apart.

Season 2
100 episodes
Three years after graduating from the academy, Ninet and Zohar became the country's most well-known couple and they plan to get married. They have moved into the luxury "Sun and Beach" apartment complex in Tel-Aviv and, surprisingly enough, their friends from the academy have also moved into the complex. Due to the ending of the first season in which Givon (Guy Zu-Aretz) was killed while trying to murder Ninet and frame Naomi, his brother Ariel (Oshri Cohen) and sister (Yael Sharoni) are in town and plan their revenge on Ninet, Naomi and Noa. While conspiring to assassinate them, Ariel falls in love with Ninet.

Season 3
73 episodes
At the beginning of the third season viewers discover that the first two seasons of the show were actually a TV show called her song. The two leading actors in her song, Rani Aviv who played Zohar Lahat (Ran Danker) and Yonatan Barak who played Ariel Silver (Oshri Cohen), are preparing to enter the army a day after they finished filming the last episode of the second season. Rani goes to the paratroopers' unit and Jonathan goes to a military band. Ninet is forced to perform service work in the band after her partner indicted her for an act he committed himself. All the other characters from the first two seasons occasionally appear by their real names. New characters join the show. At the end of the season Ninet and Yotam start dating after a rivalry.

(The reason the series' plot changed was due to Ninet's tight schedules and she could not continue the third season as regularly as in the other seasons, and yet the creators did not want to replace Ninet with another actress. In addition, the second season ended with a full ending and was planned to be the final season. Towards the middle of the third season Ninet returns to play her main character regularly until the end of the serie.)

Season 4
75 episodes
Ninet and Yotam have been in a relationship for six months. Karin and Tamara were unconscious for half a year. Tamara loses her memory. Shuki has cancer and wants Ninet to become the band's director, Ninet responds to Shuki's request and is forced to direct the band and work with Karin (the band's officer). Karin Koren discovers that Yotam murdered her on purpose. Karin assures Yotam that she will not tell anyone he shot her if he starts dating her and leaves Ninet. Later in the season it is revealed that the shooting investigation supervisor, Nora Spector, is Karin's mother. Karin blackmails Yotam that if he does not kill Ninet she will tell her all the secrets. Yotam starts cheating on Ninet, Ninet has a relationship with Rani who feels lonely and they both find solace in each other. At the end of the series Yotam almost kills Ninet after he confesses to her and reveals to her all the secrets and secrets of Karin, but he is unable and willing to kill Karin, Karin shoots Tamara (who then survives), Yotam shoots Karin and rescues Ninet. After Yotam and Ninet exchanged glances, IDF soldiers fired at Yotam.

Cast

External links
 

2004 Israeli television series debuts
2007 Israeli television series endings
Comedy-drama television series
Israeli drama television series
Israeli LGBT-related television shows
Israeli telenovelas
Musical television series
Yes (Israel) original programming
Television series about fictional musicians
Television series about show business
Television series about television
2000s Israeli television series